Jeffries Creek is a tributary and protected watershed and old growth swamp of the Great Pee Dee River in South Carolina.  Its headwaters begin just south of Hartsville, South Carolina.  It flows through Darlington and Florence counties.  The principal significance of this body of water is that it is a primary water shed of the area.  The creek is a blackwater creek that flows from the upper to lower coastal plain in a southeasterly direction.

There are several recreational uses of Jeffries Creek.  Fishing is commonly seen along the creek which contains a variety of Sunfish, Warmouth, Large Mouth Bass, Common Sucker, Pike and Gar.  Also, Birdwatching and kayaking Jeffries Creek is very enjoyable. Being an old growth Swamp, many species of Warblers and Wood Peckers can be spotted

It has an abundance of wildlife such as, Rabbits, Wild Ducks, Muskrats, Beaver, Hawks and Owls, including numerous species of Snakes, venomous and non-venomous.

Rivers of South Carolina
Tributaries of the Pee Dee River
Rivers of Darlington County, South Carolina
Rivers of Florence County, South Carolina